Pandhari Juker (died 17 February 2020), popularly known as Pandhari  Dada was an Indian make-up artist, who worked in Hindi film industry.

Filmography 

 2009, Rita
 2007, Kadachit 
 2002, Hum Pyar Tumhi Se Kar Baithe 
 1997, Gupt: The Hidden Truth 
 1995, Dilwale Dulhania Le Jayenge 
 1994, Tehkikaat 
 1994, Jealousy Turns Blood 
 1994, Mohra 
 1994, Yeh Dillagi 
 1993, Raunaq
 1993, Darr 
 1993, Aaina 
 1993, Parampara 
 1991, Lamhe 
 1991, Gunehgar Kaun 
 1990, Lekin
 1990, Izzatdaar 
 1989, Jaaydaad 
 1989, Parinda 
 1989, Chandni 
 1989, Prem Pratigyaa
 1989, Clerk 
 1988, Khatron Ke Khiladi 
 1987, Thikana 
 1987, Hifazat 
 1986, Shatru 
 1986, Kala Dhanda Goray Log 
 1986, Dharm Adhikari 
 1985, Faasle 
 1985, Saagar 
 1985, Yudh 
 1984, Karishmaa 
 1984, Duniya
 1984, Lorie 
 1982, Shakti 
 1982, Bazaar
 1982, Sanam Teri Kasam
 1981, Ek Hi Bhool 
 1981, Silsila 
 1981, Kranti 
 1978, Kaala Aadmi 
 1978, Trishul
 1977, Doosara Aadmi 
 1977, Mukti 
 1976, Bhanwar 
 1976, Kabhie Kabhie
 1976, Nagin
 1975, Himalay Se Ooncha 
 1975, Kaala Sona
 1975, Zakhmee 
 1975, Zameer 
 1975, Deewaar 
 1974, 36 Ghante 
 1974, Pran Jaye Per Vachan Na Jaye 
 1973, Joshila 
 1973, Daag: A Poem of Love
 1973, Dhund 
 1972, Dastaan 
 1971, Reshma Aur Shera 
 1970, Man Ki Aankhen 
 1970, Purab Aur Pachhim 
 1969, Ittefaq
 1968, Neel Kamal 
 1967, Bahu Begum 
 1967, Chandan Ka Palna
 1965, Kaajal
 1965, Waqt 
 1964, Chitralekha 
 1963, Taj Mahal 
 1962, Gyara Hazar Ladkian 
 1961, Dharmputra

Recognition 
The State Government of Maharashtra awarded him with the Shantaram Jeevan Gaurav for his work in 2013. He won the National Film Award at the 59th National Film Awards.

See also 
 59th National Film Awards

References

Indian make-up artists
2020 deaths